Kurt-Benny Christer Elmgren (born 31 August 1943) is a retired Swedish freestyle wrestler. He placed fifth in the 78 kg weight division at the 1966 European Championships, and competed in the 82 kg weight division at the 1972 Summer Olympics. He won the Nordic championships in 1975 and 1976 and was the national wrestling champions from 1969 to 1976.

References

External links
 

1943 births
Living people
Olympic wrestlers of Sweden
Wrestlers at the 1972 Summer Olympics
Swedish male sport wrestlers